St. Peter's Kubatana is a private Catholic secondary school and vocational training centre, located in Glen Norah, Harare, Zimbabwe. The school was founded by the Society of Jesus in 1963.

History 
In 1963 the Jesuit parish in the present Mbare area of Harare opened St. Peter’s Community Secondary School (SPCSS) for students in poverty.

The high school has, by one account, been ranked as fourth best high school in Harare.

Programs 
St. Peter's Kubatana Training Centre in Highfield, Harare, has launched an arts and culture programme and helps students to pursue arts as a career. It also assists local artists with further training and offers space for work and for exhibitions. The technical school at St. Peter’s Kubatanahas has expanded to include  welding, sewing, motor mechanics, automobile and mechanical engineering, construction and civil engineering, and woodworking. St. Peter's is also a part of a United Nations' effort to strengthen vocational and technical education in Zimbabwe.

See also

 Catholic Church in Zimbabwe
 Education in Zimbabwe
 List of Jesuit schools

References  

Jesuit secondary schools in Zimbabwe
Technical schools
Private schools in Zimbabwe
Educational institutions established in 1963
1963 establishments in Southern Rhodesia
Vocational education in Zimbabwe